Buire-le-Sec is a commune in the Pas-de-Calais department in the Hauts-de-France region in northern France.

Geography
Buire-le-Sec is a village situated some 5 miles (8 km) southeast of Montreuil-sur-Mer on the D139 road.

Population

Sights

The church is one of the most beautiful and oldest in the arrondissement of Montreuil. It was built in the 12th century, though all that remains of that church are the foundations. Some 13th century features remain, but mostly it is of 16th century construction (the nave and transept). It is in the form of a Latin cross and built from chalk. The dimensions are: 32 meters long, including 19m for the nave and 7m for the choir. The width of the choir and the nave is 6m, the transept 15.50m in total. The porch has ribbed vaulting.

See also
Communes of the Pas-de-Calais department

References

External links

 Buire-le-sec website

Communes of Pas-de-Calais